Thierry Bolle (born 24 March 1953) is a Swiss former professional racing cyclist. He rode in four editions of the Tour de France.

References

External links

1953 births
Living people
Swiss male cyclists
People from Pontarlier
Sportspeople from Doubs
Cyclists from Bourgogne-Franche-Comté